The Huff-Daland TA-2 was an American biplane trainer designed by the Huff-Daland Aero Corporation in the early 1920s for the United States Army Air Service.

Design and development
The TA-2 was a development of the Huff-Daland HD.4 Bridget with a  ABC Wasp radial engine. Three prototypes (one for static tests and two fliers) were ordered for evaluation at McCook Field. The two flying examples were later rebuilt with a re-designed fuselage, balanced rudder, smaller wings and a  Curtiss OX-5 engine. One aircraft was later re-engined with a Lawrance J-1 radial engine.

The TA-2 was re-designed with a  Lawrance J-1 engine and re-designated the Huff-Daland AT-6, one prototype only was built.

Operators

United States Army Air Service

Specifications (TA-2)

References

Huff-Daland TA-02
TA-02
Single-engined tractor aircraft
Biplanes